MV Reef Endeavour was built at the Fiji Government dockyard, Suva Fiji and was the first ship to contact the Great Barrier Reef as an attraction, in 1996, an important milestone for tourism in Australia.  Initially built for a joint venture between Captain Cook Cruises and Qantas, she was later purchased from the joint venture by Captain Cook Cruises and transferred to Fiji. She is today one of many ships that operate around the Fiji Islands exploring the Mamanuca and Yasawa Islands every week and Vanua Levu once a month. What makes the Reef Endeavour exceptional, is her small size allows her to reach remote reefs, islands and shallow bays, where bigger ships cannot proceed. Her design allows for big ship qualities, whilst maintaining a small ship feel. These features include a pool, spa, and an embarkation platform allowing access and storage for smaller boats.

A 2016 refurbishment and dry dock reduced the number of cabins and passengers slightly by interconnecting some to create suites as well as allowing for major technical and cosmetic work.

Specifications
Technical Details:
   REGISTRY: Suva, Fiji 
   IMO: 9012666
   TONNAGE: 3,125 tonnes
   LENGTH: 73 metres
   BEAM: 14 metres
   DRAFT: 3.6 metres
   SPEED: 13.5 knots
   PASSENGERS: 130
   PASSENGER CABINS: 63
   Owner: Captain Cook Cruises Fiji

See also
 MV Sydney 2000
 MV Reef Escape

References

Cruise line web site

Merchant ships of Australia
Cruise ships of Australia
1996 ships